Chevreuse is a commune in the French department of Yvelines, administrative region of Île-de-France, north-central France.

Geography

Chevreuse is located south of Paris, in the middle of a regional natural park, Parc naturel régional de la haute vallée de Chevreuse. The river Yvette flows through the area, forming the fertile Vallée de Chevreuse.

History
Chevreuse was founded in the 10th century, and celebrated its first millennium of existence in 1980. Its castle, the Château de la Madeleine, dates back to the 11th century.

The writer Patrice Pluyette, winner of the 2008 Prix Amerigo Vespucci, was born in Chevreuse in 1977.

Population

Transportation
Chevreuse is serviced by the Paris Metro system (RER B line) at the Saint-Rémy-lès-Chevreuse station in the neighboring commune by the same name, 2 km to the east. The nearest Transilien station is Trappes, 8 km to the north.

See also
Duke of Chevreuse
Port-Royal-des-Champs
Communes of the Yvelines department
Jean Racine

References

External links

Official website
Parc Naturel Chevreuse

Communes of Yvelines